Peter Wolf Crier is a Minneapolis-based folk rock band. They signed with Jagjaguwar in 2010.

The duo consists of previous Wars of 1812 band member Peter Pisano and Laarks' Brian Moen. Pisano previously worked for St. Francis-St. James United School in Saint Paul, Minnesota. Moen has frequently collaborated with Bon Iver's Justin Vernon on his side project The Shouting Matches.

Discography

Albums
Inter-be (Jagjaguwar, 2010)
Garden of Arms (Jagjaguwar, 2011)
''Plum Slump (2015)

References

External links
Official website
Peter Wolf Crier at Jagjaguwar Records
"Peter Wolf Crier at Pitchfork Media
Peter Wolf Crier: Tiny Desk Concert at NPR

Indie rock musical groups from Minnesota
Musical groups established in 2009
Musical groups from the Twin Cities
American folk rock groups
Jagjaguwar artists